"I Want a Man" is a song recorded by Canadian country music group Lace. It was released in August 1999 as the first single from their debut album, Lace. It peaked at number 7 on the RPM Country Tracks chart in November 1999.

Chart performance

Year-end charts

References

1999 songs
Lace (band) songs
143 Records singles
1999 debut singles
Songs written by Rick Giles
Songs written by Tim Nichols
Song recordings produced by David Foster